The Bottle is a community located in the northern corporate limits of Auburn, Alabama, United States.

The Bottle is named for the bright orange wooden replica of a Nehi soda bottle which stood in the location from 1924 to 1936. It has frequently been noted on lists of unusual place names.

History
Built in 1924, and billed as "the world's largest bottle", The Bottle (sometimes referred to as The "Nehi Inn") was built by John F. Williams, owner of the Nehi Bottling Company, in Opelika, Alabama. The ground floor was a grocery store and service station, and the second and third floors were living quarters and storage. The neck of the Bottle had windows so as to be used as an observation tower. The "bottle cap" was the roof. Inside there was a spiral oak stairway. The Bottle became a gathering place for tourists and locals alike to swap yarns and have parties every Friday night on the balcony above the service station.

President Franklin Delano Roosevelt stopped briefly at The Bottle after visiting Auburn, as did Grand Ole Opry comedian Minnie Pearl.

According to a 2001 account by W. A. "Arthur" Wood, The Bottle burned at 5:00 one morning in fall 1936. However, multiple contemporary newspapers claim The Bottle burned down in 1933, 1935, or 1937.

Although the structure no longer exists, a historic plaque and a photograph mark the location, and Alabama maps still list the area as "The Bottle".

Today
Currently, The Bottle's former location is only an empty lot. The property was put on sale in 2005. The land was purchased in early 2006 by the Hayley Redd Development Company.

Gallery

See also 
 Milk Bottle Grocery
 Unusual place names

References

Sources 
 Logue, Mickey & Simms, Jack (1996). Auburn: A Pictorial History of the Loveliest Village, Revised. Auburn, Ala. 

Unincorporated communities in Lee County, Alabama
Unincorporated communities in Alabama
Auburn, Alabama
Columbus metropolitan area, Georgia
Bottles
Novelty buildings in Alabama
Keurig Dr Pepper
1924 establishments in Alabama